The Okinawa Prefectural Board of Education (沖縄県教育委員会) is the prefectural education agency of Okinawa Prefecture in Japan.

The board oversees municipal school districts in Okinawa and directly operates many high schools.

Schools directly operated by the agency

Okinawa Island

Ginowan
 Futenma High School
 Ginowan High School
 Chubu Commercial High School

Itoman
 Itoman High School
 Okisui High School

Kunigami District
 Ginoza High School (Ginoza)
 Hentona High School (Ogimi)
 Hokuzan High School (Nakijin)
 Motobu High School (Motobu)

Nago
 Nago High School
 Hokubu Agricultural High School 
 Nago Technical High School

Naha
 Mawashi High School
 Naha High School
 Naha West High School
 Naha Oroku High School
 Shuri High School
 Shuri East High School
 Tomari High School
 Naha International High School
 Okinawa Technical High School 
 Naha Commercial High School

Nakagami District
 Chatan High School (Chatan)
 Kadena High School (Kadena)
 Kitanakagusuku High School (Kitanakagusuku)
 Nishihara High School (Nishihara)
 Yomitan High School (Yomitan)

Okinawa
 Koza High School
 Kyuyo High School
 Misato High School
 Misato Technical High School 
 Mirai Technical High School

Shimajiri District
 Chinen High School (Yonabaru)
 Haebaru High School (Haebaru)
 Kaiho High School  (Haebaru)
 Koyo High School  (Yaese)
 Nanbu Technical High School  (Yaese)
 Nanbu Commercial High School  (Yaese)

Tomigusuku
 Tominan High School
 Tomishiro High School
 Nanbu Agricultural High School

Urasoe
 Urasoe High School
 Yomei High School
 Naha Technical High School 
 Urasoe Technical High School 
 Urasoe Commercial High School

Uruma
 Ishikawa High School
 Maekawa High School
 Ushikawa High School
 Yokatsu High School
 Chubu Agricultural High School 
 Gushikawa Commercial High School

Ishigaki

Ishigaki
 Yaeyama High School
 Yaeyama Agricultural High School 
 Yaeyama Technical High School

Kumejima

Shimajiri District
 Kumejima High School (Kumejima)

Miyako-jima

Miyakojima
 Miyako High School
 Shonan High School 
 Miyako Agricultural High School 
 Miyako Technical High School

Irabu

Miyakojima
 Irabu High School

See also
Department of Defense Education Activity - Operates public high schools for American citizen children who are dependents of U.S. military personnel in Okinawa.

External links
 Okinawa Prefectural Board of Education

Okinawa Prefecture
Prefectural school systems in Japan